Boussy-Saint-Antoine is a railway station on the border of Boussy-Saint-Antoine and Quincy-sous-Senart, both in Essonne, Île-de-France, France. The station was opened in 1995 and is on the Paris–Marseille railway. The station is served by the RER Line D, which is operated by SNCF. The station serves the communes of Boussy-Saint-Antoine, Épinay-sous-Sénart and Quincy-sous-Senart.

Station info
Situated at an altitude at 72 meters above sea level, the station is on the 23.958 kilometer point of the Paris-Marseille railway, between the stations of Brunoy and Combs-la-Ville – Quincy.  The station served 3,487,143 people in 2019.

Train services
The following services serve the station:

Local services (RER D) Goussainville – Saint-Denis – Gare de Lyon – Villeneuve-Saint-Georges – Boussy-Saint-Antoine – Combs-la-Ville–Quincy – Melun
Local services (RER D) Gare de Lyon – Maison Alfort-Alfortville – Villeneuve-Saint-Georges – Boussy-Saint-Antoine – Combs-la-Ville–Quincy – Melun

References

External links
 
 

Railway stations in Essonne
Réseau Express Régional stations
Railway stations in France opened in 1969